Thomas Otey Feamster (October 23, 1930 – June 9, 2020) was a professional American football player for the National Football League's Baltimore Colts. He played in twelve games in the 1956 season after his collegiate career at William & Mary and then Florida State.

In 1969, Feamster entered a seminary and was later ordained an Episcopal priest. In 1979, he served as a minister to John Spenkelink prior to Spenkelink's execution.

References

External links
NoleFan.com statistics

1930 births
2020 deaths
American football defensive ends
Baltimore Colts players
Basketball players from Virginia
Centers (basketball)
Florida State Seminoles football players
Florida State Seminoles men's basketball players
Players of American football from Virginia
Sportspeople from Newport News, Virginia
William & Mary Tribe football players
American Episcopal priests
American men's basketball players